Paleo-Indians, Paleoindians or Paleo-Americans were the first peoples who entered, and subsequently inhabited, the Americas during the final glacial episodes of the late Pleistocene period. The prefix paleo- comes from the Greek adjective palaios (παλαιός) 'old; ancient'. The term Paleo-Indians applies specifically to the lithic period in the Western Hemisphere and is distinct from the term Paleolithic.

Traditional theories suggest that big-animal hunters crossed the Bering Strait from North Asia into the Americas over a land bridge (Beringia). This bridge existed from 45,000 to 12,000 BCE (47,000–14,000 BP). Small isolated groups of hunter-gatherers migrated alongside herds of large herbivores far into Alaska. From  BCE ( BP), ice-free corridors developed along the Pacific coast and valleys of North America. This allowed animals, followed by humans, to migrate south into the interior of the continent. The people went on foot or used boats along the coastline. The precise dates and routes of the peopling of the Americas remain subjects of ongoing debate. At least two morphologically different Paleo-Indian populations were coexisting in different geographical areas of Mexico 10,000 years ago.

Stone tools, particularly projectile points and scrapers, are the primary evidence of the earliest human activity in the Americas. Archeologists and anthropologists use surviving crafted lithic flaked tools to classify cultural periods. Scientific evidence links Indigenous Americans to eastern Siberian populations. Indigenous peoples of the Americas have been linked to Siberian populations by the distribution of blood types, and genetic composition as indicated by molecular data, such as DNA. There is evidence for at least two separate migrations. From 8000 to 7000 BCE (10,000–9,000 BP) the climate stabilized, leading to a rise in population and lithic technology advances, resulting in a more sedentary lifestyle.

Migration into the Americas 

Researchers continue to study and discuss the specifics of Paleo-Indian migration to and throughout the Americas, including the exact dates and routes traveled. The traditional theory holds that these early migrants moved into Beringia between eastern Siberia and present-day Alaska 17,000 years ago, at a time when the Quaternary glaciation significantly lowered sea levels. These people are believed to have followed herds of now-extinct pleistocene megafauna along ice-free corridors that stretched between the Laurentide and Cordilleran ice sheets. An alternative proposed scenario involves migration - either on foot or using boats - down the Pacific coast to South America. Evidence of the latter would have been submerged by a sea-level rise of more than a hundred meters following the end of the last glacial period.

The time range of the peopling of the Americas  remains a source of substantial debate. Conventional estimates have it that humans reached North America at some point between 15,000 and 20,000 years ago. The few areas of agreement achieved to date are the origin from Central Asia, with widespread habitation of the Americas during the end of the last glacial period, or more specifically what is known as the late glacial maximum, around 16,000–13,000 years before present. However, alternative theories about the origins of Paleoindians exist, including migration from Europe.

Periodization 

Sites in Alaska (East Beringia) are where some of the earliest evidence has been found of Paleo-Indians, followed by archaeological sites in northern British Columbia, western Alberta and the Old Crow Flats region in the Yukon. The Paleo-Indian would eventually flourish all over the Americas. These peoples were spread over a wide geographical area; thus there were regional variations in lifestyles. However, all the individual groups shared a common style of stone tool production, making knapping styles and progress identifiable. This early Paleo-Indian period's lithic reduction tool adaptations have been found across the Americas, utilized by highly mobile bands consisting of approximately 20 to 60 members of an extended family. Food would have been plentiful during the few warm months of the year. Lakes and rivers were teeming with many species of fish, birds and aquatic mammals. Nuts, berries and edible roots could be found in the forests and marshes. The fall would have been a busy time because foodstuffs would have to be stored and clothing made ready for the winter. During the winter, coastal fishing groups moved inland to hunt and trap fresh food and furs.

Late ice-age climatic changes caused plant communities and animal populations to change. Groups moved from place to place and sought new supplies as preferred resources were depleted. Small bands utilized hunting and gathering during the spring and summer months, then broke into smaller direct family groups for the fall and winter. Family groups moved every 3–6 days, possibly traveling up to  a year. Diets were often sustaining and rich in protein due to successful hunting. Clothing was made from a variety of animal hides that were also used for shelter construction. During much of the Early and Middle Paleo-Indian periods, inland bands are thought to have subsisted primarily through hunting now-extinct megafauna. Large Pleistocene mammals were the giant beaver, steppe wisent, musk ox, mastodons, woolly mammoths and ancient reindeer (early caribou).

The Clovis culture, appearing around 11,500 BCE ( BP), did not rely exclusively on megafauna for subsistence. Instead, they employed a mixed foraging strategy that included smaller terrestrial game, aquatic animals, and a variety of flora. Paleo-Indian groups were efficient hunters and carried a variety of tools. These included highly efficient fluted-style spear points, as well as microblades used for butchering and hide processing. Projectile points and hammerstones made from many sources are found traded or moved to new locations. Stone tools were traded and/or left behind from North Dakota and Northwest Territories, to Montana and Wyoming. Trade routes also have been found from the British Columbia Interior to the coast of California.

The glaciers that covered the northern half of the continent began to gradually melt, exposing new land for occupation around 17,500–14,500 years ago. At the same time as this was occurring, worldwide extinctions among the large mammals began. In North America, camelids and equids eventually died off, the latter not to reappear on the continent until the Spanish reintroduced the horse near the end of the 15th century CE. As the Quaternary extinction event was happening, the Late Paleo-Indians would have relied more on other means of subsistence.

From  BCE ( BP), the broad-spectrum big game hunters of the great plains began to focus on a single animal species: the bison (an early cousin of the American bison). The earliest known of these bison-oriented hunting traditions is the Folsom tradition. Folsom peoples traveled in small family groups for most of the year, returning yearly to the same springs and other favored locations on higher ground. There they would camp for a few days, perhaps erecting a temporary shelter, making and/or repairing some stone tools, or processing some meat, then moving on. Paleo-Indians were not numerous and population densities were quite low.

Classification 

Paleo-Indians are generally classified by lithic reduction or lithic core "styles" and by regional adaptations. Lithic technology fluted spear points, like other spear points, are collectively called projectile points. The projectiles are constructed from chipped stones that have a long groove called a "flute". The spear points would typically be made by chipping a single flake from each side of the point. The point was then tied onto a spear of wood or bone. As the environment changed due to the ice age ending around 17–13 Ka BP on short, and around 25–27 Ka BP on the long, many animals migrated overland to take advantage of the new sources of food. Humans following these animals, such as bison, mammoth and mastodon, thus gained the name big-game hunters. Pacific coastal groups of the period would have relied on fishing as the prime source of sustenance.

Archaeologists are piecing together evidence that the earliest human settlements in North America were thousands of years before the appearance of the current Paleo-Indian time frame (before the late glacial maximum 20,000-plus years ago). Evidence indicates that people were living as far east as northern Yukon, in the glacier-free zone called Beringia before 30,000 BCE (32,000 BP). Until recently, it was generally believed that the first Paleo-Indian people to arrive in North America belonged to the Clovis culture. This archaeological phase was named after the city of Clovis, New Mexico, where in 1936 unique Clovis points were found in situ at the site of Blackwater Draw, where they were directly associated with the bones of Pleistocene animals.

Recent data from a series of archaeological sites throughout the Americas suggest that Clovis (thus the "Paleo-Indians") time range should be re-examined. In particular, sites located near Cooper's Ferry in Idaho, Cactus Hill in Virginia, Meadowcroft Rockshelter in Pennsylvania, Bear Spirit Mountain in West Virginia, Catamarca and Salta in Argentina, Pilauco and Monte Verde in Chile, Topper in South Carolina, and Quintana Roo in Mexico have generated early dates for wide-ranging Paleo-Indian occupation. Some sites significantly predate the migration time frame of ice-free corridors, thus suggesting that there were additional coastal migration routes available, traversed either on foot and/or in boats. Geological evidence suggests the Pacific coastal route was open for overland travel before 23,000 years ago and after 16,000 years ago.

South America 

In South America, the site of Monte Verde indicates that its population was probably territorial and resided in their river basin for most of the year. Some other South American groups, on the other hand, were highly mobile and hunted big-game animals such as gomphotheres and giant sloths. They used classic bifacial projectile point technology.

The primary examples are populations associated with El Jobo points (Venezuela), fish-tail or Magallanes points (various parts of the continent, but mainly the southern half), and Paijan points (Peru and Ecuador) at sites in grasslands, savanna plains, and patchy forests.

The dating for these sites ranges from  BP (for Taima-Taima in Venezuela) to  BP. The bi-pointed El Jobo projectile points were mostly distributed in north-western Venezuela; from the Gulf of Venezuela to the high mountains and valleys. The population using them were hunter-gatherers that seemed to remain within a certain circumscribed territory. El Jobo points were probably the earliest, going back to  BP and they were used for hunting large mammals. In contrast, the fish-tail points, dating to c. 11,000 B.P. in Patagonia, had a much wider geographical distribution, but mostly in the central and southern part of the continent.

Archaeogenetics 
 

The haplogroup most commonly associated with Amerindian genetics is Haplogroup Q-M3. Y-DNA, like (mtDNA), differs from other nuclear chromosomes in that the majority of the Y chromosome is unique and does not recombine during meiosis. This allows the historical pattern of mutations to be easily studied. The pattern indicates Indigenous Amerindians experienced two very distinctive genetic episodes: first with the initial peopling of the Americas, and secondly with European colonization of the Americas. The former is the determinant factor for the number of gene lineages and founding haplotypes present in today's Indigenous Amerindian populations.

Human settlement of the Americas occurred in stages from the Bering sea coast line, with an initial layover on Beringia for the founding population. The micro-satellite diversity and distributions of the Y lineage specific to South America indicates that certain Amerindian populations have been isolated since the initial colonization of the region. The Na-Dené, Inuit and Indigenous Alaskan populations, however, exhibit haplogroup Q (Y-DNA) mutations that are distinct from other Amerindians with various mtDNA mutations. This suggests that the earliest migrants into the northern extremes of North America and Greenland derived from later migrant populations.

Evidence from full genomic studies suggests that the first people in the Americas diverged from Ancient East Asians about 36,000 years ago and expanded northwards into Siberia, where they encountered and interacted with a different Paleolithic Siberian population (known as Ancient North Eurasians), giving rise to both Paleosiberian peoples and Ancient Native Americans, which later migrated towards the Beringian region, became isolated from other populations, and subsequently populated the Americas.

Transition to archaic period 

The Archaic period in the Americas saw a changing environment featuring a warmer, more arid climate and the disappearance of the last megafauna. The majority of population groups at this time were still highly mobile hunter-gatherers, but now individual groups started to focus on resources available to them locally. Thus with the passage of time there is a pattern of increasing regional generalization like the Southwest, Arctic, Poverty, Dalton, and Plano traditions. These regional adaptations would become the norm, with reliance less on hunting and gathering, and a more mixed economy of small game, fish, seasonally wild vegetables, and harvested plant foods. Many groups continued to hunt big game but their hunting traditions became more varied and meat procurement methods more sophisticated. The placement of artifacts and materials within an Archaic burial site indicated social differentiation based upon status in some groups.

See also 

 Adams County Paleo-Indian District – (Archeological site)
 Arlington Springs Man – (Human remains)
 Blackwater Draw – (Archeological site)
 Borax Lake Site – (Archeological site)
 Buhl woman – (Human remains)
 Calico Early Man Site – (Archeological site)
 Caverna da Pedra Pintada – (Archeological site)
 Cody complex – (Culture group)
 Cueva de las Manos – (Cave paintings)
 East Fork Site – (Archeological site)
 Fort Rock Cave – (Archeological site)
 Hiscock Site – (Archeological site)
 Kennewick Man – (Human remains)
 Leanderthal Lady – (Human remains)
 Lehner Mammoth-Kill Site – (Archeological site)
 Lindenmeier site – (Archeological site)
 Luzia Woman – (Human remains)
 Marmes Rockshelter – (Archeological site)
 Mastodon State Historic Site – (Archeological site)
 Mummy Cave – (Archeological site)
 Naia – (Human remains)
 Paisley Caves – (Archeological site)
 Peñon woman – (Human remains)
 Post Pattern – (Archaeological culture)
 San Dieguito complex – (Archeological site)
 Sandia Man Cave – (Archeological site)
 Upward Sun River site – (Archeological site)
 Witt Site – (Archeological site)
 X̲áːytem – (Archeological site)
 Quad site – (Archeological site)

Notes

References

Further reading

External links

 Atlas of the Human Journey, Genographic Project, National Geographic
 Journey of Mankind - Genetic Map - Bradshaw Foundation
 The Paleoindian Period - United States Department of the Interior, National Park Service
 Alabama Archaeology: Prehistoric Alabama - The University of Alabama, Department of Archaeology
 The Paleoindian Database - The University of Tennessee, Department of Anthropology.
 Paleoindians and the Great Pleistocene Die-Off - American Academy of Arts and Sciences, National Humanities Center

 
+1
+1
+1
History of indigenous peoples of North America
History of Indigenous peoples in Canada
Native American history
History of the Americas
History of North America
History of South America
Hunter-gatherers
Hunter-gatherers of the United States
Hunter-gatherers of Canada
Hunter-gatherers of South America
Late Pleistocene
Mesoamerica
Pleistocene life
Pleistocene North America
Pleistocene South America
Pre-Columbian archaeology